Rachel Sarah Bloomekatz (born December 3, 1982) is an American lawyer from Ohio who is a nominee to serve as a United States circuit judge of the United States Court of Appeals for the Sixth Circuit.

Early life and education 

Bloomekatz was born on December 3, 1982, in Southfield, Michigan. She received her Bachelor of Arts, magna cum laude, from Harvard University in 2004 and her Juris Doctor from UCLA School of Law in 2008.

Career 

After graduation from law school, she served as a law clerk for Judge Guido Calabresi of the United States Court of Appeals for the Second Circuit from 2008 to 2009. From 2009 to 2010, she served as a law clerk for Chief Justice Margaret H. Marshall of the Massachusetts Supreme Judicial Court. She served as an assistant attorney general in the Office of the Attorney General in Boston from 2010 to 2011.

From 2011 to 2012, Bloomekatz served as a law clerk for Justice Stephen Breyer of the Supreme Court of the United States. From 2013 to 2015, she was an associate at Jones Day in Columbus. From 2016 to 2019, she was a principal at Gupta Wessler PLLC. In addition, she has also represented Everytown Law, which is the legal branch of Everytown for Gun Safety and was legal director for Senator Sherrod Brown's 2012 reelection campaign. Since 2019, she has been a solo practitioner at Bloomekatz Law LLC in Columbus, Ohio. Bloomekatz teaches federal courts at the Ohio State University Moritz College of Law.

Notable cases 

In 2014, Bloomekatz authored an amicus brief for U.S. Senator Marco Rubio in the United States Court of Appeals for the Fourth Circuit to support victims of human trafficking.
Following the 2016 primary election, the Sixth Circuit appointed Bloomekatz as amica on appeal to represent the district court's order that the polling locations within the counties of Butler, Clermont, Hamilton and Warren be extended for one hour due to Interstate I-275 being closed for hours due to a fatal accident.
Bloomekatz represented Brandon Moore in his appeals from his sentence following a conviction by a jury on three counts of aggravated robbery, three counts of rape, three counts of complicity to rape, kidnapping, aggravated menacing, and multiple firearm specifications. Moore committed these crimes when he was 15 years old. Bloomekatz prevailed before the Ohio Supreme Court in challenging his sentence as a violation of the Eighth Amendment. Later, upon appointment by the Ohio Seventh District Court of Appeals, she appealed from a Mahoning County Common Pleas Court judgment requiring him to report annually for a period of 15 years after the trial court classified him as a sexually oriented offender because, as the prosecutor agreed, the wrong law was applied.

Nomination to court of appeals 

In April 2022, Bloomekatz was one of two women being considered for nomination to the United States Court of Appeals for the Sixth Circuit, the other being former Solicitor General of Ohio Alexandra Schimmer. On May 25, 2022, President Joe Biden nominated Bloomekatz to serve as a United States circuit judge of the United States Court of Appeals for the Sixth Circuit.  President Biden nominated Bloomekatz to the seat to be vacated by Judge R. Guy Cole Jr., who would assume senior status on January 9, 2023. A hearing on her nomination was held before the Senate Judiciary Committee on June 22, 2022. During her confirmation hearing, Republican senators questioned her about gun control cases and the pro bono work that she had been involved with. On August 4, 2022, the Senate Judiciary Committee was deadlocked on her nomination by a 10–10–2 vote. On January 3, 2023, her nomination was returned to the President under Rule XXXI, Paragraph 6 of the United States Senate; she was renominated later the same day. On February 9, 2023, her nomination was reported out of committee by an 11–10 vote. Her nomination is pending before the United States Senate.

See also 
 Joe Biden judicial appointment controversies

References 

1982 births
Living people
21st-century American women lawyers
21st-century American lawyers
Harvard University alumni
Jones Day people
Law clerks of the Supreme Court of the United States
Lawyers from Columbus, Ohio
Ohio lawyers
People from Southfield, Michigan
UCLA School of Law alumni